Many notable computer scientists and others have been associated with the Palo Alto Research Center Incorporated (PARC), formerly Xerox PARC. They include:

 Nina Amenta (at PARC 1996–1997), researcher in computational geometry and computer graphics
 Anne Balsamo (at PARC 1999–2002), media studies scholar of connections between art, culture, gender, and technology
 Patrick Baudisch (at PARC 2000–2001), in human–computer interaction
 Daniel G. Bobrow (at PARC 1972–2017), artificial intelligence researcher
 Susanne Bødker (at PARC 1982–1983), researcher in human–computer interaction
 David Boggs (at PARC 1972–1982), computer network pioneer, coinventor of Ethernet
 Anita Borg (at PARC 1997–2003), computer systems researcher, advocate for women in computing
 John Seely Brown (at PARC 1978–2000), researcher in organizational studies, chief scientist of Xerox
 Bill Buxton (at PARC 1989–1994), pioneer in human–computer interaction
 Stuart Card (at PARC 1974-2010), applied human factors in human–computer interaction
 Robert Carr (at PARC in late 1970s), CAD and office software designer
 Ed Chi (at PARC 1997–2011), researcher in information visualization and the usability of web sites
 Elizabeth F. Churchill (at PARC 2004–2006), specialist in human-computer interaction and social computing
 Lynn Conway (at PARC 1973–1982), VLSI design pioneer and transgender activist
 Franklin C. Crow (at PARC circa 1982–1990), computer graphics expert who did early research in antialiasing
 Pavel Curtis (at PARC 1983–1996), pioneer in text-based online virtual reality systems
 Doug Cutting (at PARC 1990-1994), creator of Nutch, Lucene, and Hadoop
 Steve Deering (at PARC circa 1990–1996), internet engineer, lead designer of IPv6
 L Peter Deutsch (at PARC 1971–1986), implementor of LISP 1.5, Smalltalk, and Ghostscript
 David DiFrancesco (at PARC 1972–1974), worked with Richard Shoup on PAINT, cofounded Pixar
 Paul Dourish (at PARC mid-1990s), researcher at the intersection of computer science and social science
 W. Keith Edwards (at PARC 1996–2004), researcher in human-computer interaction and ubiquitous computing
 Jerome I. Elkind (at PARC 1971–1978), head of the Computer Science Laboratory at PARC
 Clarence Ellis (at PARC 1976–1984), first African American CS PhD, pioneered computer-supported cooperative work
 David Em (at PARC 1975), computer artist, first fine artist to create a computer model of a 3d character
 Bill English (at PARC 1971–1989), co-invented computer mouse
 David Eppstein (at PARC 1989–1990), researcher in computational geometry and graph algorithms
 John Ellenby (at PARC 1975–1978), Led AltoII development, 1979 founded GRID Systems
 Matthew K. Franklin (at PARC 1998–2000), developed pairing-based elliptic-curve cryptography
 Gaetano Borriello (at PARC 1980–1987), developed Open Data Kit
 Richard Fikes (at PARC 1976-1983),  leader in representation and use of knowledge in computer systems, Professor Emeritus, Stanford University
 Sean R. Garner (at PARC circa 2009– ), researcher in photovoltaics and sustainable engineering
 Charles Geschke (at PARC 1972–1980), invented page description languages, cofounded Adobe
 Adele Goldberg (at PARC 1973–1986), codesigned Smalltalk, president of ACM
 Jack Goldman (at PARC 1970–), Xerox chief scientist 1968–1982, founded PARC in 1970
 Bill Gosper (at PARC 1977–1981), founded the hacker community, pioneered symbolic computation
 Rich Gossweiler (at PARC 1997–2000), software engineer, expert in interaction design
 Rebecca Grinter (at PARC 2000–2004), researcher in human-computer interaction and computer-supported cooperative work
 Neil Gunther (at PARC 1982–1990), developed open-source performance modeling software
 Jürg Gutknecht (at PARC 1984–1985), programming language researcher, designer, with Niklaus Wirth
 Marti Hearst (at PARC 1994–1997), expert in computational linguistics and search engine user interfaces
 Jeffrey Heer (at PARC 2001-2005), expert in information visualization and interactive data analysis
 Bruce Horn (at PARC 1973–1981), member of original Apple Macintosh design team
 Bernardo Huberman (at PARC circa 1982–2000), applied chaos theory to web dynamics
 Dan Ingalls (at PARC circa 1972–1984), implemented Smalltalk virtual machine, invented bit blit
 Van Jacobson (at PARC 2006– ), developed internet congestion control protocols and diagnostics
 Natalie Jeremijenko (at PARC 1995), installation artist
 Ted Kaehler (at PARC 1972–1985), developed key systems for original Smalltalk, later Apple HyperCard, Squeak
 Ronald Kaplan (at PARC 1974–2006), expert in natural language processing, helped develop Interlisp
 Jussi Karlgren (at PARC 1991-1992), known for work on stylistics, evaluation of search technology, and statistical semantics
 Lauri Karttunen (at PARC 1987–2011), developed finite state morphology in computational linguistics
 Alan Kay (at PARC 1971–1981), pioneered object-oriented programming and graphical user interfaces
 Martin Kay (at PARC 1974– ), expert on machine translation and computational linguistics
 Gregor Kiczales (at PARC 1984–2002), invented aspect-oriented programming
 Ralph Kimball (at PARC 1972–1982), designed first commercial workstation with mice, icons, and windows
 Andras Kornai (at PARC 1988-1991), mathematical linguist
 Butler Lampson (at PARC 1971–1983), won Turing Award for his development of networked personal computers
 David M. Levy (at PARC 1984–1999), researcher on information overload
 Cristina Lopes (at PARC 1995–2002), researcher in aspect-oriented programming and ubiquitous computing
 Richard Francis Lyon (at PARC 1977–1981), built the first optical mouse
 Jock D. Mackinlay (at PARC 1986–2004) researcher in information visualization
 Cathy Marshall (at PARC circa 1989–2000), researcher on hypertext and personal archiving
 Edward M. McCreight (at PARC 1971–1989) co-invented B-trees
 Scott A. McGregor (at PARC 1978–1983) worked on Xerox Star, Viewers for Cedar and then Windows 1.0 at Microsoft
 Sheila McIlraith (at PARC 1997–1998), researcher in artificial intelligence and the semantic web
 Ralph Merkle (at PARC 1988–1999), invented public key cryptography and cryptographic hashing
 Diana Merry (at PARC circa 1971–1986), helped develop Smalltalk, co-invented bit blit
 Robert Metcalfe (at PARC 1972–1979), co-invented Ethernet, formulated Metcalfe's Law
 James G. Mitchell (at PARC 1971–1984), developed WATFOR compiler, Mesa (programming language), Spring (operating system), ARM RISC chip
 Louis Monier (at PARC 1983–1989), founded AltaVista search engine
 Thomas P. Moran (at PARC 1974–2001), founded journal Human-Computer Interaction
 James H. Morris (at PARC 1974–1982), co-invented KMP string matching algorithm and lazy evaluation
 Elizabeth Mynatt (at PARC 1995–1998), studied digital family portraits and ubiquitous computing
 Greg Nelson (at PARC 1980–1981), satisfiability modulo theories, extended static checking, program verification, Modula-3, theorem prover
 Martin Newell (at PARC 1979–1981), graphics expert who created the Utah teapot
 William Newman (at PARC 1973–1979), Graphics and HCI researcher, developed drawing and page description software
 Geoffrey Nunberg (at PARC 1987–2001), linguist known for his work on lexical semantics
 Severo Ornstein (at PARC 1976–1983), founding head of Computer Professionals for Social Responsibility
 Valeria de Paiva (at PARC 2000–2008), uses logic and category theory to model natural language
 George Pake (at PARC 1970–1986), pioneer in nuclear magnetic resonance, founding director of PARC
 Jan O. Pedersen (at PARC circa 1990-1996), researcher in search system technology and algorithms
 Peter Pirolli (at PARC 1991– ), developed information foraging theory
 Calvin Quate (at PARC 1983–1994), invented the atomic force microscope
 Ashwin Ram (at PARC circa 2011– ), researcher on artificial intelligence for health applications
 Trygve Reenskaug (at PARC 1978–1979), formulated model–view–controller user interface design
 George G. Robertson (at PARC circa 1988–1995), information visualization expert
 Daniel M. Russell (at PARC 1982–1993), AI and UI research; later at Apple, then at Google, where he calls himself a search anthropologist
 Eric Schmidt (at PARC 1982–1983), CEO of Google and chairman of Alphabet
 Ronald V. Schmidt (at PARC 1980–1985), computer network engineer who founded SynOptics
 Michael Schroeder (at PARC circa 1977–1985), co-invented Needham–Schroeder protocol for encrypted networking
 Bertrand Serlet (at PARC 1985–1989), led the Mac OS X team
 Scott Shenker (at PARC 1984–1998), leader in software-defined networking
 John Shoch (at PARC 1971–1980), developed an important predecessor of TCP/IP networking
 Richard Shoup (at PARC 1971–1978), invented SUPERPAINT and the first 8 bit Frame Buffer (picture memory), 1979 cofounded Aurora
 Charles Simonyi (at PARC 1972-1981), led the creation of Microsoft Office
 Alvy Ray Smith (at PARC 1974), cofounded Pixar
 Brian Cantwell Smith (at PARC 1982–1996), invented introspective programming and researches computational metaphors
 David Canfield Smith (at PARC 1975), invented interface icons, programming by demonstration, worked on graphical user interface, Xerox Star
 Robert Spinrad (at PARC 1978–1982), designed vacuum tube computers, directed PARC
 Bob Sproull (at PARC 1973–1977), designed early head-mounted display, wrote widely used computer graphics textbook
 Jessica Staddon (at PARC 2001–2010), information privacy researcher
 Gary Starkweather (at PARC 1970–1988), invented laser printers and color management
 Maureen C. Stone (at PARC circa 1980–1998), expert in color modeling
 Lucy Suchman (at PARC 1980–2000), researcher on human factors, cybercultural anthropology, and feminist theory
 Bert Sutherland (at PARC 1975–1981), brought social scientists to PARC
 Robert Taylor (at PARC 1970–1983), managed early ARPAnet development, founded DEC Systems Research Center
 Warren Teitelman (at PARC 1972–1984), designed Interlisp
 Shang-Hua Teng (at PARC 1991–1992), invented smoothed analysis of algorithms and near-linear-time Laplacian solvers
 Larry Tesler (at PARC 1973–1980), developed Object Pascal and Apple Newton
 Chuck Thacker (at PARC 1971–1983), chief designer of Alto, co-invented Ethernet
 John Warnock (at PARC 1978–1982), cofounded Adobe
 Mark Weiser (at PARC 1987–1999), invented ubiquitous computing
 Niklaus Wirth (at PARC 1976–1977 and 1984–1985), designed Pascal and other programming languages
 Frances Yao (at PARC 1979–1999), researcher in computational geometry and combinatorial algorithms
 Annie Zaenen (at PARC 2001–2011), researcher on linguistic encoding of temporal and spatial information
 Lixia Zhang (at PARC 1989–1996), computer networking pioneer

References

PARC